William Grout may refer to:

 William L. Grout (1833–1908), American industrialist and manufacturer
 William W. Grout (1836–1902), U.S. Representative from Vermont
 W. H. J. Grout (William Henry James Grout), inventor and manufacturer of bicycles

See also
 John William Grout, soldier killed in the American Civil War, subject of the poem "The Vacant Chair"